Return of the Tender Lover is the eighth studio album from American R&B singer Babyface. It was released December 4, 2015, on Def Jam Recordings. The album pays homage to his classic 1989 album, Tender Lover and serves as the follow-up to his last album Grown & Sexy (2005). It is his first solo album of new studio material in 10 years.

While its lyrics focus mainly on themes of romance, perseverance and devotion, Return of the Tender Lover incorporates pop-soul love songs as well as elements of old-school R&B that evokes some his earlier work. As a result, the album received generally positive reviews from critics who praised the album's production, songwriting and direction.

"We've Got Love" was released as the album's lead single on August 4, 2015. Return of The Tender Lover is the singer's first solo album since Playlist (2007), and his first consisting of only original material since Grown & Sexy (2005).

Background
Following the release of his collaborative album with Toni Braxton, Love, Marriage & Divorce (2014) which was a commercial success, Babyface finished Return of The Tender Lover with Daryl Simmons and Kameron Glasper. Babyface said of the process: "It was an organic thing where the songs came fast — I didn’t want to do too many songs, just an old-school album, eight songs, and just make sure they’re eight good ones". Babyface has called the album "Unapologetic R&B" and said: "It doesn’t have to be the kind of hi-hats or kick or 808s [sound]. It’s just going to be a real drummer, bass player, guitar player, piano player. It’s going to feel real good based off of  musicianship."

Reception

Critical reception 

Return of the Tender Lover received generally positive reviews from music critics. At Metacritic, which assigns a normalized rating out of 100 to reviews from mainstream critics, the album received an average score of 76, indicating "generally favorable reviews". Andy Kellman of AllMusic gave the album four stars out of five, calling it "smooth, all about romance, devotion and perseverance" while adding that it's "among Babyface's best". Ken Capobianco of The Boston Globe gave the album a B−, stating that "Babyface remains polished yet funky...", realizing that he "can't compete with the obsessive bedpost-rattling Ty Dolla Signs and The Weeknds of the world". He goes on to add that he "proclaims his love for women for who they are, instead of what they can do for him".

Commercial performance
In the United States, the album debuted at number 39 on the Billboard 200 with 19,000 first-week sales.

Track listing
All tracks produced by Babyface; except "I Want You" produced by Babyface and Daryl Simmons.

Charts

Weekly charts

Year-end charts

Personnel
Credits adapted from liner notes.
 Babyface - vocals, writer, producer, keyboards, executive producer, guitar, background vocals, drum programming, A&R
 Tony Russell - bass
 Demonte Posey - Hammond B3 organ
 Andre Delano - saxophone
 Daryl Simmons - writer, producer
 Kameron Glasper - writer, background vocals
 Richie Pena - drums
 Walter Barnes - bass
 Brandon Coleman - Wurlitzer
 After 7 - vocals, background vocals
 El DeBarge - vocals, background vocals
 Michael Ripoll - guitar
 Greg Phillinganes - piano
 Lemar Carter - drums
 Nathan East - bass
 Paul Boutin -recording, mixing, percussion
 Herb Powers, Jr. - mastering
 Randee St. Nicholas - photography
 Kyledidthis - Art direction, design

References

2015 albums
Babyface (musician) albums